The Pleasure of Penetration, released in 1990, is the first full-length album by Leæther Strip. It was released on Zoth Ommog.

Track listing
 Die - Die - Die 
 Touchdown Breakdown
 Razor Blades (Go Berserk) 
 Leather Strip - Part I
 Leather Strip - Part II 
 Khomeini 
 Body - Machine - Body 
 Go Fuck Your Ass Off! 
CD bonus tracks:
 Break My Back
 Change!
The 2007 remastered edition adds the following tracks:
 Japanese Bodies
 Battleground
 Leæther Strip Part II Re-animated
 Fit for Flogging
 Murder
The 2007 edition contains also a second CD of remakes of the songs of the album called The Pleasure of Reproduction.

Leæther Strip albums
1990 debut albums
Zoth Ommog Records albums